Meera Krishnan (born 1968) is an Indian actress, who has appeared in Tamil-language films and television serials.<ref>{{Cite web | url=https://www.vikatan.com/oddities/women/137200-interview-with-actress-meera-krishnan-and-family | title=வீணைதான் என் முதல் அடையாளம்! - மீரா கிருஷ்ணன் }}</ref> She started her career as an announcer on the public broadcaster Doordarshan and later became a newsreader for Sun TV before acting in films and teleserials. She is also a Veena player.

Filmography
Actress

Dubbing artist
Manochitra - Sandakozhi (2005)
Sriranjini - Anniyan'' (2005)

Television

References

External links
 

Indian film actresses
Living people
Actresses in Tamil cinema
Television personalities from Tamil Nadu
Actresses from Chennai
21st-century Indian actresses
1968 births